Lentilitoribacter  is a genus of Gram-negative, aerobic, non-spore-forming bacteria. Lentilitoribacter donghaensis is the only known species of this genus.

References

Rhizobiaceae
Monotypic bacteria genera
Bacteria genera